Richard Nutt (25 June 1911 – 5 February 1985) was an Australian cricketer. He played six first-class matches for New South Wales between 1931/32 and 1932/33.

See also
 List of New South Wales representative cricketers

References

External links
 

1911 births
1985 deaths
Australian cricketers
New South Wales cricketers
Cricketers from Sydney